43 may refer to: 
 43 (number)
 one of the years 43 BC, AD 43, 1943, 2043
 Licor 43, also known as "Cuarenta Y Tres" ("Forty-three" in Spanish)
 George W. Bush, 43rd president of the United States, nicknamed "Bush 43" to distinguish from his father
 "Forty Three", a song by Karma to Burn from the album Appalachian Incantation, 2010